The March of the Guards to Finchley, also known as The March to Finchley or The March of the Guards, is a 1750 oil-on-canvas painting by English artist William Hogarth, owned by and on display at the Foundling Museum. Hogarth was well known for his satirical works, and The March of the Guards to Finchley has been said to have given full scope to this sense of satire; it was described by Hogarth himself as "steeped in humour".

The painting is a depiction of a fictional mustering of troops on the Tottenham Court Road to march north to Finchley to defend the capital from the second Jacobite rebellion of 1745, which was part of a series of uprisings that had been occurring since the late 17th century and were aimed at returning the Stuart Dynasty to the throne after the Glorious Revolution of 1688. It portrays the soldiers in a humorous light, placing exaggerated emphasis on their lack of training and respect for discipline.

The March of the Guards to Finchley was originally intended to be a gift to the incumbent King of England, George II. However, George was insulted by the apparent jab at his best troops and rejected it when it was offered to him. Upset at the King's spurning of his work, Hogarth opted to change the engraving and present the painting instead to the King of Prussia, Frederick II, who, being known for his skills as a soldier rather than an artist, was reportedly much more satisfied with the gift.

Historical background 

The Jacobite risings were a series of rebellions affecting all of the British Isles except for Wales and that occurred between 1688 and 1746, four years before the painting of March of the Guards to Finchley. Centred on attempts by Jacobites to restore James II and his descendants, the House of Stuart, to the throne, there were two major uprisings, referred to as the "First" (1715) and "Second" (1745) "Jacobite Rebellions". This painting shows a fictional incident during the second rising.

The "'45" was the product of the disappointment of Charles Edward Stuart, the exiled Jacobite pretender, with the French's unwillingness to invade England to restore the House of Stuart to power. In 1744, Charles decided to finance the military and social costs of an uprising, believing that he would be able to take the kingdom. With the support of various Scottish Highland clans, Stuart was initially successful. The rebels defeated government forces at the Battle of Prestonpans, and captured Edinburgh. The Stuart army invaded England, passing through Carlisle and reaching Derby on 4 December 1745. However, promised support from France failed to arrive, and, in the absence of an English popular uprising, Charles assented to the demand of his Council of War to return to Scotland. Eventually, the Stuart army was comprehensively defeated at Culloden Moor on 16 April 1746.

Painting

Background 

Hogarth completed March of the Guards to Finchley in 1750. The work was initially meant as a gift to George II, and a print was sent before the release of the painting to the Royal Palace for his approval. However, George II had been expecting an artwork that honoured his most favoured guards, not mocked them – accounts state he was offended by what he considered an insult on Hogarth's part. The following dialogue is said to have taken place between George II and the deliverer of the portrait, the Earl of Harrington, when the painting was taken to the King for inspection:
"Pray, who is this Hogarth?"
"A painter, my liege."
"I hate painting and poetry too! Neither the one nor the other ever did any good!"
"The picture, please your majesty, must undoubtedly be considered as a burlesque!"
"What? A painter burlesque a soldier? He deserves to be picketed for his insolence! Take this trumpery out of my sight."
Soon thereafter, the painting was returned to Hogarth, who was reportedly mortified by the King's response to what he considered to be one of his finest works. Hogarth later modified the inscription to read "the King of Prussia", rather than "the King of England", before presenting the work to Frederick II of Prussia, who met the work with more enthusiasm and acknowledgement of its artistry. However, Frederick II was certainly no expert on the arts, and he was more known on the battlefield; some have speculated that this explains his positive reception to a work depicting the English military in poor form.

The patriotism of the painting provides a satirical counterpoint to Hogarth's overt antipathy to the French, evident in his painting The Gate of Calais, completed in 1748. Hogarth's later dedication of March to the King of Prussia further enforces this view; Frederick II was a renowned military strategist, but not an art connoisseur. The composition of the picture may have been inspired by Jean-Antoine Watteau's Départ de Garnison.

An engraved version, by Hogarth's assistant, Luke Sullivan, was published shortly after the painting was completed, though Hogarth made further alterations to the engraving ten years later. The engraving was unusual in that it was not a reversed image of the original painting. Hogarth priced the published artwork for a price of seven shillings and sixpence each copy, rising to half a Guinea after the subscription closed. In advertisements for the painting, Hogarth referred to a subscription-based extra whereby buyers who deposited another three shillings on top of the seven and sixpence would be considered in a lottery for the ownership of the original copy, which would be delivered to the winning subscriber after the engraving had been finished. Hogarth's engraving of A Stand of Arms, Musical Instruments, Etc. served as the subscription and lottery ticket. As noted by Hogarth in the 1 May 1750 edition of The General Advertiser, this subscription offer ended on 30 April 1750. At the day of closure, there were 1843 chances sold and 167 chances still remaining in Hogarth's lottery, and he gave this remainder to the Foundling Hospital, an establishment to which he had, in the past, been a lucrative donor. Holding almost 10% of the tickets, the Hospital won the lottery and the original; Hogarth scholar Ronald Paulson considers the lottery was rigged from the start. Today the painting is owned by and on display at the Foundling Museum.

Analysis
The painting depicts a scene on Tottenham Court Road, a bustling street on the north side of London. The King's guard have rendezvoused there on their way to engage the rebels, and numerous soldiers are caught amongst the crowd. Orderly lines of soldiers march away in the distance; meanwhile, a disarrayed, misshapen mass of soldiers engaging in a range of unbecoming behaviours crowds the foreground. Paradoxically, the work both highlights the dissolute and disreputable nature of the guardsmen and shows that they can be transformed into a disciplined fighting force, with the drummer and boy fifer summoning the soldiers to their duty.

In the approximate centre of the piece, two women apparently quarrel fiercely over the courtship of a grenadier. The woman to his right, a pregnant ballad-seller, carries a basket full of copies of "God Save the King", while the older woman to his left, dressed in dark priest's robes with a crucifix swinging around the neck, holds a rolled Jacobite newspaper above her head. Some critics have seen Hogarth's incorporation of the "God Save the King" text to represent public support for the Crown: English musician and author Percy Scholes said the painting symbolises the nation "wavering between the Hanoverian Protestant Succession and Stuart Romanist Succession", with "God Save the King" "thoroughly associated with the former."

Behind the three, another soldier and a milkmaid are caught in a passionate embrace. A drummer standing to the left is similarly the centre of feminine attention – perhaps his wife and child; behind, a man urinates against the tavern wall, pained by his venereal infection. Further to the right, near the edge of the painting, a drunken soldier has collapsed to the ground from his own intoxication; despite his state, he rejects the water his comrade behind him is offering him, and instead reaches for another measure of gin from the woman to his left. Soldiers directly behind him – one of whom clenches an upturned knife – are robbing the civilians. Nearby, a hungry guard gladly takes food from the platter of a pieman. To the left-hand-side of the middleground, a boxing match between two soldiers is underway, with an eager group of spectators onlooking. Across the street, numerous prostitutes holler down to the men from open windows of Mother Douglas's house, as do soldiers to their cohorts.

According to Hogarth, several of the more prominent soldiers featured in the painting – such as the grenadier, the drummer and the drunkard – were based from models observed before the creation of the artwork. Notable in particular among these is Lord Albemarle Bertie, who was used as the model for the man seen standing with fists clenched behind the two boxers.

Reception 
Critics have likened the chaotic scene of The March of the Guards to Finchley to the narrative of English satirist Henry Fielding's Tom Jones. In his Hogarth's Literary Relationships, Robert E. Moore states that the "elements" of comedy" in The March of the Guards to Finchley are "the very essence of Fielding's comedy as well":

Notes

References 

1750 paintings
Paintings by William Hogarth
Paintings in London
Musical instruments in art